Stephen Michael Donlan (born 4 September 1954) is an English former professional rugby league footballer who played in the 1970s and 1980s. He played at representative level for Great Britain and England, and at club level for Leigh (Heritage № 877), Wigan (Heritage № 812), Bradford Northern and Springfield Borough, as a goal-kicking .

Background
Steve Donlan was born in Leigh, Lancashire, England, and attended Leigh Boys Grammar School. After leaving school, he joined a local accounting firm in 1972, eventually becoming Managing Director of the practice.

He is the father of the rugby league footballer, and coach; Stuart Donlan.

Playing career

Leigh
Donlan was signed by Leigh in 1978 from the town's rugby union club.

Donlan played , and scored a drop goal in Leigh's 8-3 victory over Widnes in the 1981 Lancashire Cup Final during the 1981–82 season at Central Park, Wigan on Saturday 26 September 1981.

Donlan played in Leigh's victory in the Championship during the 1981–82 season.

Wigan
In January 1985, Donlan was signed by Wigan for a fee of £28,000.

Donlan played , in Wigan's 28-24 victory over Hull F.C. in the 1985 Challenge Cup Final during the 1984–85 season at Wembley Stadium, London on Saturday 4 May 1985.

International honours
Steve Donlan won a cap for England while at Leigh in 1984 against Wales, and won caps for Great Britain while at Leigh in 1984 against New Zealand (sub), and Papua New Guinea (sub).

References

External links
Statistics at wigan.rlfans.com

1954 births
Living people
Blackpool Borough players
Bradford Bulls players
England national rugby league team captains
England national rugby league team players
English rugby league players
Great Britain national rugby league team players
Leigh Leopards captains
Leigh Leopards players
Rugby league centres
Rugby league fullbacks
Wigan Warriors players